The Danlou Occurrence, also known as the Danlou Gold Occurrence and the Mortimer Occurrence, is a mineralized zone in Northeastern Ontario, Canada. Gold is the occurrence's primary commodity while copper and silver are secondary commodities. It occurs in a quartz vein within a diabase-porphyry shear zone. Pyrite and chalcopyrite are present in small amounts.

It is named after Danlou Mines Limited, which did work on the Danlou Occurrence in the early 1960s.

Trenches and a vertical exploration shaft are present in the Danlou Occurrence from past mineral explorations. Work began in 1905 when the occurrence was discovered that year. During this period, a small test pit was sunk into the quartz vein. In 1961–1963, Danlou Mines Limited performed trenching. All drill samples assayed nil for gold and silver.

See also
List of mines in Temagami

References

Mines in Temagami
Surface mines in Canada
Underground mines in Canada
Gold mines in Ontario
Silver mines in Canada
Copper mines in Ontario
Ore deposits
Geology of Temagami